Barenaked Ladies is a Canadian rock band formed in 1988 in the Toronto suburb of Scarborough, Ontario. The band developed a following in Canada, with their self-titled 1991 cassette becoming the first independent release to be certified gold in Canada. They reached mainstream success in Canada when their debut with Reprise Records, Gordon, featuring the singles "If I Had $1000000" and "Brian Wilson", was released in 1992. The band's popularity subsequently spread into the US, beginning with versions of "Brian Wilson" and "The Old Apartment" off their 1996 live album Rock Spectacle, followed by their fourth studio album Stunt, their breakout success in 1998. The album featured their highest-charting hit, "One Week", as well as "It's All Been Done" and "Call and Answer". Their fifth album, Maroon, featuring the lead single "Pinch Me", also charted highly. In the 2010s the band became well-known for creating the theme song for the sitcom The Big Bang Theory.

Initially a duo of Ed Robertson and Steven Page, the band quickly grew to a quintet adding brothers Jim and Andy Creeggan and Tyler Stewart by 1990. Andy Creeggan left the band in 1995 and was replaced by Kevin Hearn. Page left in 2009, reducing the group to a quartet.

The band's style has evolved throughout their career, and their music, which began as exclusively acoustic, quickly grew to encompass a mixture of pop, rock, hip hop, rap, etc. The band's live performances feature comedic banter and free-style rapping between songs. They have won multiple Juno Awards and have been nominated for two Grammy Awards. The group has sold over 15 million albums and singles and were inducted into the Canadian Music Hall of Fame in March 2018.

History

Indie origins (1988–1991)
Barenaked Ladies began as the duo of Ed Robertson and Steven Page. The two went to school together since Robertson was in grade four (Page was a grade ahead) at Churchill Heights Public School but were not friends until they met each other at a Harvey's restaurant after a Peter Gabriel concert. Each was pleased to find that the other liked Gabriel; they began talking and found they had many of the same tastes. The two became friends and bonded further when they were both counsellors at Interprovincial Music Camp located in McKellar, Ontario. Page was impressed by Robertson’s ability to harmonize when they began playing songs together.

Page had an extra ticket to a Bob Dylan concert at Exhibition Stadium and asked Robertson to join him. Bored, they amused each other by pretending they were rock critics and inventing histories about the Dylan band. They also invented fictional band names, one of which was "Barenaked Ladies."

On another front, Robertson had agreed to perform with his cover band in a battle of the bands at Nathan Phillips Square for the Second Harvest food bank, but the band broke up. A week before the show, Robertson received a phone call to confirm the gig, so he improvised the band had changed its name to "Barenaked Ladies." He then called Page and asked if he wanted to do the gig; Page reportedly could not believe Robertson had given that name. They arranged three rehearsals and missed them all. Instead of competing at the show on 1 October 1988, while the other bands set up they played every song they both knew. The show went well, and they were invited to open for another established local band, The Razorbacks, at the Horseshoe Tavern the coming weekend. Missing three more scheduled rehearsals, they improvised their set once again. These acts set a precedent for Barenaked Ladies concerts, which still almost always contain improvised raps, songs, and banter.

Page and Robertson continued performing and began writing songs together. The band's first tape, Buck Naked (1989), was made using a four-track recorder in basements and bedrooms. The pair became followers of comedy group Corky and the Juice Pigs, to whom they give credit for exposing them to the idea of comedic stage presence. Page and Robertson presented the group with their tape and were invited to open for the Juice Pigs on their cross-Canada tour. One night in Toronto, Page and Robertson invited friends from music camp, brothers Andy Creeggan (percussion) and Jim Creeggan (bass), to play with them at a Christmastime club show. Featuring the two new band members, Barenaked Lunch (a.k.a. The Pink Tape) was released in 1990 despite being mastered incorrectly and playing too fast.

After six months, Andy Creeggan went on a student exchange trip to South America, leaving the band without a percussionist. While playing at a buskers' festival in Waterloo, Ontario in the summer of 1990, they met drummer Tyler Stewart, and he took over the position. During Andy Creeggan's travels, the band gained attention winning the 1990 YTV Achievement Award for Best Band/Musical Group. and by squeezing into a small "Speaker's Corner" video booth in Toronto to perform "Be My Yoko Ono". The popular clip noticeably increased the band's fanbase. Andy Creeggan returned in early 1991 to find that Stewart had taken over the role of percussionist. Causing him some concern, Creeggan began playing keyboards more, though he still performed on some songs with congas and other percussion. The band would soon embark upon their first full Canadian tour.

Early Canadian success (1991–1992)
The full band's first commercial release was 1991's The Yellow Tape. A demo tape originally created for the band's performance at South by Southwest, it was the first recording to feature all five members and cost them $2,000–$3,000. They sent copies to all the labels in Canada; all of them refused. As they began selling more and more copies off the stage, through word of mouth people began asking for the tape in local stores. When retailers began asking the band for more tapes, the demo became a commercial release. Sales began to snowball based merely on word of mouth and their live shows. Page's father, Victor, created the independent label Page Publications to handle the cassette's manufacturing and distribution. (After the band signed to a major label, Page Publications remained in operation, later releasing albums by artists such as The Lowest of the Low, Leslie Spit Treeo, Annette Ducharme, David Gogo, and Bodega.)

During this era, the band garnered radio airplay with a live cover of Dean Friedman's "McDonald's Girl", which included a rap break incorporating lyrics from Beastie Boys' "Hey Ladies". Another major break for the band came in November 1991 when Barenaked Ladies contributed a cover of Bruce Cockburn's "Lovers in a Dangerous Time" to the Cockburn tribute album Kick at the Darkness. The song became the band's first Top 40 hit in Canada.

Sales of The Yellow Tape were jump-started when the band was removed from the lineup of the 1991 New Year's Eve concert in Nathan Phillips Square outside Toronto City Hall because a staffer for then-mayor June Rowlands believed the band's name objectified women; the decision was affirmed by city councillor Chris Korwin-Kuczynski. The group shrugged it off and booked another show at McMaster University. However, the media picked up the story and presented it as an example of political correctness gone too far. The first article earned the paper a large quantity of mail against City Hall's decision as the story became increasingly prominent. A week after New Year's, the band was asked to take a photo in front of City Hall for the front page of the Toronto Star. The newer stories targeted Rowlands even though she had not been directly involved with removing the band from the concert and was out of town when the decision was made. The following week, sales of the Yellow Tape exploded — by February 1992, it was outselling even Michael Jackson's Dangerous, Genesis' We Can't Dance, and U2's Achtung Baby in some downtown Toronto record stores. They received enough publicity from the incident that MuchMusic offered them its second-ever Intimate and Interactive special on 17 January. The tape eventually became the first-ever indie release to achieve platinum status (100,000 copies) in Canada.

By the end of February, Toronto City Council revised its rules for event bookings at Nathan Phillips Square in the hopes of avoiding another similar controversy. The City Hall story has followed the band ever since; Robertson credits the scale of the story to it being a slow news week.

First albums (1992–1997)

The band was signed to Sire Records in April 1992 after a long period of being rejected by every label they approached.

The band's first full album, Gordon, was released in July 1992 and was a big success in Canada; by the end of August, it had already been certified platinum. It included some of the band's most well-known songs, including "Enid", the first single; "Be My Yoko Ono", the single which helped fund the album; "If I Had $1000000", which spawned a tradition of throwing Kraft Dinner during live shows, which the band later discouraged; and "Brian Wilson", named after Beach Boy Brian Wilson (who later covered the song on a live album). Gordon benefited from a number of its songs (including the latter three) being live favourites and had been recorded for past releases like The Yellow Tape. Although the band was doing remarkably well in Canada, they found it translated into little success in the US.

The band's second album, Maybe You Should Drive (1994), was much less popular with the Canadian public. Their tour of the US was deemed a failure and lost money despite an appearance on Late Night with Conan O'Brien. Before the next release, Andy Creeggan decided to leave the band. He had become disillusioned with the direction of the band and was not comfortable with their new fame. According to Page, he had considered leaving as early as the rehearsals for the Drive album; the rest of the band convinced him to stay to record that album and for the subsequent touring. Also, Creeggan wanted to attend McGill University to study music further. Tyler Stewart has also suggested that Creeggan had never fully accepted his replacement by Stewart as a percussionist. Andy Creeggan's departure came during a time in which members of the band were starting to become sick of one other, with Page and Robertson rarely communicating. Stewart cites the departure as worsening the situation. Page also began struggling with alcohol abuse and depression. In an attempt to correct the band's downward slide, they signed with Terry McBride and Nettwerk as their management.

The band released Born on a Pirate Ship as a quartet in 1996. The album received two large boosts from the inclusion of the song "Shoe Box" on the Friends soundtrack and from the Jason Priestley-directed video for "The Old Apartment", which got notable U.S. airplay and while the album had stronger sales than Maybe You Should Drive, it still did not match the success of "Gordon". The group appeared as the guest band on an episode of Beverly Hills, 90210 ("Spring Breakdown" original airdate: 2 April 1997), immediately preceding their 1997 tour; they performed "The Old Apartment", "Life, In A Nutshell", and "Brian Wilson" at the Peach Pit After Dark night club. Tyler Stewart invited his friend Kevin Hearn to replace Andy Creeggan as a keyboardist for the tour, ultimately joining the band full-time. The group also had a cameo in the Canadian film The Wrong Guy with Dave Foley in 1997. They performed the song "Gangster Girl" as police officers in an alley on their break.

From two dates on the Born on a Pirate Ship tour during 1996, Barenaked Ladies recorded and released a live album called Rock Spectacle, which had a modest American radio hit with "Brian Wilson". The album became the band's first gold record in the United States, and the success of "Brian Wilson" and "The Old Apartment" led to a new situation for the band. They knew their next album would be their chance to make it big in the States.

Breakthrough success in the United States (1998–2004)
Stunt (1998) became their greatest mainstream success, buoyed by the single "One Week", which spent—coincidentally—one week at No. 1 on the Billboard Hot 100. Stunt reached No. 3 in the US  Billboard 200 and No. 9 in Canada. Kevin Hearn was diagnosed with leukemia shortly after the album was released, eventually receiving bone marrow transplants from his brother and missing most of the Stunt tour.

The band toured, with friends Chris Brown and Greg Kurstin both filling in on keyboards until Hearn recovered enough to rejoin them on tour. The singles "It's All Been Done" (used as the opening theme song on the short-lived animated television series Baby Blues) and "Call and Answer" (which later appeared in the film EdTV) were also modest hits. The band was asked to contribute a song ("Get in Line") to the soundtrack of the Fox cartoon King of the Hill. Barenaked Ladies also had a guest appearance in a 1999 episode of Two Guys, a Girl and a Pizza Place.

Led by the "Pinch Me" single, in the US Maroon (2000) did not perform as well as Stunt had, reaching only No. 5 on the Billboard Top 100, however, it topped the Canadian charts. In 2001, they released a compilation album entitled Disc One: All Their Greatest Hits (1991–2001), referencing a line from "Box Set". It contained 15 singles from previous albums, two singles from other compilations, and two new tracks (dubbed "our new greatest hits" by Robertson during the subsequent tour).

After finishing a tour on 31 December 2001 in Rosemont, Illinois to promote the compilation, the band decided to take a year off, occasionally playing shows such as the Medals Plaza at the 2002 Winter Olympics in Salt Lake City before returning to the studio in April 2003.

Everything to Everyone was released on 21 October 2003, coinciding with the first show of the unique Peep Show tour. The first single off the album was "Another Postcard (Chimps)", which received modest radio play. "Testing 1,2,3" was the second single from the album and received a video, but no CD single, while "Celebrity" was released later in the UK with a CD single, but no video. "Maybe Katie" (and an edited version of "For You" from a concert in Glasgow) were also released as singles to radio. The album was their weakest seller in years and had a short chart life. The release fulfilled their contract with Reprise Records, and they did not re-sign. This made the group independent for the first time since 1992 (though they retained a distribution relationship with Warner Bros. Records). On the subsequent Everywhere For Everyone tour, in early 2004, the band began offering their full live shows for purchase as a download or CD-R via their website, as well as subsequent studio releases.

The band recorded the theme song for the 2000 children's program Seven Little Monsters. They also appeared in "The Honeymoon's Over", the premiere of Charmeds third season, performing "Pinch Me" onstage at the fictional night club P3. In 2003 they recorded the theme song for Odd Job Jack.

Return to independence (2004–2008)

The band's next album was Barenaked for the Holidays, released on 5 October 2004. It was their first independent record since The Yellow Tape, as well the first album recorded at Page's recently-completed farmhouse studio, Fresh Baked Woods. The band created the record label Desperation Records for this album.

In January 2005, the band taped a television pilot for a variety show, tentatively titled Barenaked Ladies Variety Show, which was ultimately rejected by the Fox network. Later that year, the band was asked to write music for the Stratford Festival of Canada's musical production of Shakespeare's As You Like It. Page wrote most of the music (Shakespeare had provided lyrics in the play), and the band recorded it for the actors to sing over. The recording (with Page's vocals) was available on CD from the festival as well as the band's website. On 2 July they participated in the Live 8 concert in Barrie, Ontario. Following several writing sessions throughout 2005, that fall the band entered the studio at Fresh Baked Woods to begin recording 29 songs. They broke from the studio in November and December to play a 22-show holiday tour, playing one of their new songs each night. An iTunes Originals – a collection of interviews and live songs (coupled with some old album tracks) was recorded while the band was in the studio. It was released in February 2006, when the band went back into the studio to finish up the recordings they started the previous fall. Initially unsure how to release so many songs, the band decided to release a single-disc album in early September entitled Barenaked Ladies Are Me. Several alternate versions are available, including downloadable versions and a USB flash drive version. The B.L.A.M. tour in support of the album and its follow-up, Barenaked Ladies Are Men, which hailed from the same sessions, ran in fall 2006 and briefly in June 2007 for the US, February 2007 for Canada, and later in 2007 for the UK. That same year the band wrote and recorded the theme song for the television series The Big Bang Theory.

On 6 May 2008, the band released an album of original material aimed at children entitled Snacktime!. The album features artwork by Hearn in its liner notes, which is also available in the form of a hardcover book with CD included. The album was promoted with a series of television and in-store appearances at bookstores in the US northeast, the West Coast, and Toronto.

Complications began in July 2008 when the band cancelled several appearances at several Disney Music Block Party concerts following Page's arrest on allegations of cocaine possession. In August, Robertson crashed his single-engine plane (without casualty) and his mother passed away that December. Band members lamented how the events of the year marred their 20th anniversary festivities (1 October 2008).

Departure of Page (2009–2011)
On 24 February 2009, Barenaked Ladies and Steven Page separately announced that Page had left the band by "mutual agreement." The remaining members continued as a quartet while Page pursued solo projects, including theatrical opportunities. In July, it was announced the band had left Nettwerk management and had hired the newly merged management firm CAM 8.

Robertson commented on the departure of one of the band's founding members:

Barenaked Ladies entered the studio as a quartet in May 2009 to record a new album with producer Michael Phillip Wojewoda. "You Run Away", the lead single from the new album, was released to Canadian radio on 8 January. All in Good Time was released 23 March 2010 in Canada and 30 March in the US. On 6 January 2010, the band announced that it had signed an exclusive worldwide distribution deal with EMI Label Services. The same announcement implied that following the departure of Page, the band has created a new label called Raisin' Records.

All in Good Time was generally well-received by critics. The band toured the U.S. and Canada during the summer of 2010, with an autumn leg in the United Kingdom. When asked about Page's departure, Tyler Stewart said, "We don't keep in touch, but we certainly we wish him the best, and there's good will there." In October 2010, Page stated that he has no plans to rejoin the band soon, other than a possible one-off performance. He added that it felt strange the group continued to use the same name and perform the songs that he wrote and performed.

Page commented in August 2011 that around the subsequent time of his arrest for cocaine possession, "the band was no longer the joyous place that it once was, but it hadn't been joyous for a long time before that. It wasn't that we didn't put on good shows, we still had a great time onstage every night," he added. "But it became a place where work was just about the stress and not the end product."

In September 2015, TMZ uncovered court documents showing that Page sued Robertson over the "Big Bang Theory Theme" song, alleging that he was promised 20% of the proceeds but Robertson kept the money.

Modern day (2011–present)
The band released a second greatest-hits album, Hits from Yesterday & the Day Before, through Rhino Entertainment (a division of their former parent label, Warner Music Group) on 27 September 2011. Another Rhino album, Stop Us If You've Heard This One Before, containing previously-recorded but unreleased rarities, was planned for release later in 2011 but was delayed until 8 May 2012.

Barenaked Ladies was commissioned to compose the original score for a musical based on National Lampoon's Animal House. The project was announced in early 2012. However, by mid-2013, the band had been dropped from the production.

The band returned to the studio in May 2012 to record a single, "Boomerang". The session was produced by Gavin Brown. The band indicated plans for "Boomerang" to be released as a single during the summer of 2012 in conjunction with their Last Summer On Earth tour on which the song was performed nightly. The single was also performed on the late 2012 Symphony Barenaked Tour but remained unreleased. The band had mentioned the possibility of abandoning the album concept and releasing only singles and EPs. However, the band went into the studio in February and March 2013 to work on a full album, which was released as Grinning Streak on 4 June 2013. The band then signed with Vanguard Records for the release, their first label album of originals since going independent following 2003's Everything to Everyone. "Boomerang" was added to the new album tracks and was released as a single on 26 March 2013. Two further singles were released: "Odds Are" in late 2013 and "Did I Say That Out Loud?" in mid-2014. Each of the latter singles had a music video produced by Rooster Teeth Productions.

Looking to maintain a high profile, the band began work on a new album in December 2014. The band's 11th studio album, Silverball, was released on 2 June 2015, three days before the band kicked off its Last Summer on Earth 2015 tour with Violent Femmes and Colin Hay. The lead single, "Say What You Want", was released on 28 April 2015. The music video for the next single, "Duct Tape Heart", contained live footage of the band's performance at Red Rocks Amphitheatre on the Last Summer On Earth 2015 tour, was released on 19 October 19 to coincide with the start of the Canadian leg of the Silverball tour.

Barenaked Ladies released their second live album, BNL Rocks Red Rocks, on 20 May 2016. It was recorded at Red Rocks Amphitheatre on the Last Summer on Earth 2015 tour. The band also held a Last Summer on Earth 2016 tour with Orchestral Manoeuvres in the Dark and Howard Jones in conjunction with the new live album. BNL Rocks Red Rocks is the band's first commercial live release since the departure of Page in 2009.

On 23–24 October 2016, the band recorded an album with New York City a cappella group, The Persuasions and producer Gavin Brown. The album, Ladies and Gentlemen: Barenaked Ladies and The Persuasions, consisted of new versions of existing Barenaked Ladies songs (along with one Kevin Hearn song and one Persuasions song). It was released on 14 April 2017.

The band returned to the studio in the winter of 2017 to record their 12th studio album, Fake Nudes. The lead single, "Lookin' Up", along with "Bringing It Home", were made available for download to those who pre-ordered the album. The album itself was released on 17 November 2017.

On 25 March 2018, the band was inducted into the Canadian Music Hall of Fame at the Juno Awards in Vancouver. The band performed alongside former members Steven Page (who was included in the induction) and Andy Creeggan. This was Page's first performance with the band since his departure in 2009. Despite his presence at the ceremony, Andy Creeggan was not inducted into the Hall with the other five members. Though there are reportedly no plans for another reunion, neither side has ruled it out.

In the summer of 2019, Barenaked Ladies took a break from their own Last Summer On Earth tours and opened for Hootie and the Blowfish on that band's 44-date Group Therapy Tour. It was the band's first tour as an opening act since the early 1990s.

On 4 October 2019, Rhino Records released a new greatest hits collection titled Original Hits, Original Stars exclusively on vinyl.

On 14 January 2020, Robertson stated he was working on songs for a new album, with a tour to follow supported by Gin Blossoms and Toad the Wet Sprocket. The tour was slated to begin on 3 June in St. Augustine, Florida and end on 23 July in Toronto but was delayed until 2021, and delayed again until 2022, due to the COVID-19 pandemic. In conjunction with the original tour announcement, the band also launched the "Barenaked Bytes" mobile app, allowing fans to gain access to ticket pre-sales, VIP packages, news, and discounts on merchandise.

Starting 29 March 2020, the band began releasing a series of webcam-based performances that they have dubbed #SelfieCamJam on their YouTube channel in response to the need for isolation during the COVID-19 pandemic.

Their 13th studio album, Detour de Force, was released on 16 July 2021, aided by the singles "Flip", "Good Life" and "New Disaster".

In September 2021, Robertson revealed that Barenaked Ladies were working on a "secret project" with Rush bassist Geddy Lee.

Band members
Current
Ed Robertson – lead and backing vocals, lead and rhythm guitars (1988–present)
Jim Creeggan – double bass, bass guitar, backing and lead vocals (1989–present), keyboards (1995)
Tyler Stewart – drums, percussion (1990–present), backing and lead vocals (2008–present)
Kevin Hearn – keyboards, lead and rhythm guitars, lead and backing vocals (1995–present)

Former
Steven Page – lead and backing vocals, rhythm and lead guitars (1988–2009)
Andy Creeggan – percussion (1989-1990, 1991-1995), keyboards, backing and lead vocals (1991–1995), drums (1989-1990)

Timeline

Innovation and technology 
Barenaked Ladies has often attempted to use new technologies to promote themselves and their music. They were among the early adopters of computers for promotion when they released an "Interactive Press Kit" on a 3.5-inch floppy disk for Maybe You Should Drive in 1994, which earned them a MuchMusic Video Award. They used their website to allow fans to choose between two songs ("Be My Yoko Ono" and "Alternative Girlfriend") for inclusion on their greatest hits CD Disc One (though polling was nearly tied and both songs were included).

Beginning in April 2003, the band started a blog on its website to keep fans updated personally, coinciding with the band's return to the studio for Everything to Everyone. During a subsequent studio session for Barenaked Ladies Are Me, Ed Robertson began a podcast in addition to the blog, which ran from February to August 2006 (with a series of four videos added in early 2007 with highlights from the band's first cruise).

The band has adopted many of the current online social networking sites, including accounts on MySpace, Facebook, and Twitter. The Twitter feed has been integrated into the band's website, and it also typically announces new blog posts with a link. These accounts have been used for contests and to debut new tracks. Different band members have also had individual accounts on these sites at times.

Barenaked Ladies has sold recordings of almost all of its live concerts since early 2004. Initially, shows were sold on CD-R or as MP3 downloads. By the end of 2004, lossless FLAC files were also offered. Professionally printed copies of some concerts were later offered through some isolated record stores, and some shows have been added to the iTunes Music Stores and other digital retailers.

The band was praised for a unique use of USB flash drive technology. The group offered its 2004 Barenaked For the Holidays album on a customized flash drive in MP3 format, with extras including bonus tracks and photos and videos from the studio sessions for the album. The band used a 128 MB USB flash drive, limiting the bitrate of the music included. The group described the product as a test of the technology and the market for that technology. It subsequently released Are Me in the USB format as well (on a 256 MB flash drive). The band also incorporated the technology into its live music sales, offering fans a copy of concerts in MP3 format on a USB stick at the merchandise booth directly after the show.

In 2009 the band took part in an interactive documentary series, City Sonic. The series, which featured 20 Toronto artists, includes Tyler Stewart reflecting on his memories of the (now closed) Ultrasound Showbar. The films were accompanied by an iPhone application, which uses Global Positioning System (GPS) technology to unlock more videos when the user is close to the specific location.

In February 2013, Barenaked Ladies participated in what was billed as the "first space-to-earth musical collaboration" involving the band and Chris Hadfield, a Canadian astronaut and commander of the International Space Station, along with the Wexford Gleeks, a Canadian student choir. The group, Hadfield, and the choir performed a song "I.S.S. (Is Somebody Singing)" that was commissioned by the Canadian Broadcasting Corporation and the Canadian Space Agency.

Awards and nominations

In 1993, Barenaked Ladies were nominated for their first four Juno Awards: Canadian Entertainer of the Year, Album of the year for Gordon, Single of the Year for Enid, and Group of the Year, which was their only win. The group was again nominated for Entertainer of the Year in 1994 and Group of the Year in 1995. Barenaked Ladies' first Grammy nomination came in 1999 for "One Week" in the Pop Performance by a Duo or Group category but lost to Brian Setzer's "Jump, Jive an' Wail". The song, and its album Stunt, brought the band three more Juno Awards that year, for Best Single, Best Pop Album, and Best Group. Robertson lost to Bryan Adams in the newly revived Best Songwriter Category. The video for "One Week" was nominated for an MTV Video Music Award for Best Art Direction, but lost to "Doo Wop (That Thing)" by Lauryn Hill.

The band was nominated for their second Grammy in 2001 for "Pinch Me", again in the Pop Vocal Performance by a Duo or Group category, but lost to "Cousin Dupree" by Steely Dan. They also won three more Juno Awards for Maroon under Best Pop Album, Best Album, and Best Group, bringing their total to seven. "Pinch Me" was nominated for Best Single but lost to "I'm Like a Bird" by Nelly Furtado. Additionally, Page and Robertson were nominated in the Best Songwriter category in its penultimate year for "Pinch Me", "Too Little Too Late", and "Falling for the First Time".

Five more Juno nominations have followed, totalling 18 nominations for the band (in addition to the two songwriting nominations). In 2004 they were up for Pop Album of the Year for Everything to Everyone, as well as Group of the Year. In 2005, they were up for Music DVD of the Year for the documentary The Barenaked Truth. In 2006, they were again nominated for Group of the Year. They were nominated for and subsequently won a 2009 Juno for their children's album Snacktime!.

Billboard Music Awards
The Billboard Music Awards is sponsored by Billboard magazine and held annually in December. Barenaked Ladies has received two awards from two nominations.

|-
|rowspan="2"| 1998 ||rowspan="2"| "One Week" || Best Clip (Alternative/Modern Rock) || 
|-
| Maximum Vision Award || 

Grammy Awards
The Grammy Awards are awarded annually by the National Academy of Recording Arts and Sciences of the United States. Barenaked Ladies has received two nominations.

|-
|  || "One Week" || Best Pop Performance by a Duo or Group || 
|-
|  || "Pinch Me" || Best Pop Performance by a Duo or Group with Vocal || 

Juno Awards
The Juno Awards is a Canadian awards ceremony presented annually by the Canadian Academy of Recording Arts and Sciences. Barenaked Ladies has received eight awards from 18 nominations.

|-
|rowspan="4"|  || Barenaked Ladies || Entertainer of the Year || 
|-
| Barenaked Ladies || Group of the Year || 
|-
| Gordon || Album of the Year || 
|-
| "Enid" || Single of the Year || 
|-
|  || Barenaked Ladies || Entertainer of the Year || 
|-
|  || Barenaked Ladies || Group of the Year || 
|-
|rowspan="3"|  || Barenaked Ladies || Best Group || 
|-
| Stunt || Best Pop Album || 
|-
| "One Week" || Best Single || 
|-
|rowspan="4"|  || Barenaked Ladies || Best Group || 
|-
|rowspan="2"| Maroon || Best Album || 
|-
| Best Pop Album || 
|-
| "Pinch Me" || Best Single || 
|-
|rowspan="2"|  || Barenaked Ladies || Group of the Year || 
|-
| Everything to Everyone || Pop Album of the Year || 
|-
| || The Barenaked Truth || Music DVD of the Year || 
|-
| || Barenaked Ladies || Group of the Year || 
|-
| || Snacktime! || Children's Album of the Year || 

Further, the band members and other individuals have been nominated for four Junos for their work in connection with the band.

|-
| || Marc Ramaer ("Hush Sweet Lover" by k.d. lang and "Jane" by Barenaked Ladies)|| Recording Engineer of the Year || 
|-
| rowspan="2" |  || Ed Robertson ("One Week") || Best Songwriter|| 
|-
| John Rummen, Jay Blakesburg (Stunt) || Best Album Design || 
|-
|  || Steven Page and Ed Robertson ("Pinch Me", "Too Little Too Late", "Falling for the First Time") || Best Songwriter|| 

MTV Video Music Awards
The MTV Video Music Awards is an annual awards ceremony established in 1984 by MTV. Barenaked Ladies has received one nomination.

|-
|  || "One Week" || Best Art Direction (Art Director: Paul Martin) || 

MuchMusic Video Awards
The MuchMusic Video Awards (MMVAs) is an annual awards ceremony presented by Canadian television station MuchMusic that honours the best music videos. In the past, the awards included some vote-in People's Choice categories that were not specifically tied to videos. Barenaked Ladies has received four awards and several other nominations.

|-
|rowspan="2"| 1992 || rowspan="2"| "Lovers in a Dangerous Time" || VideoFACT Award || 
|-
| People's Choice: Best Group || 
|-
| 1993 || "Brian Wilson" || People's Choice: Best Group || 
|-
| 1995 || Maybe You Should Drive || Best Canadian Band Interactive Press Kit || 
|-
|rowspan="3"| 2001 || "Pinch Me" || MuchMoreMusic Award || 
|-
| rowspan="2"| "Too Little Too Late" || People's Choice: Favourite Canadian Group || 
|-
| People's Choice: Favourite Video by a Canadian || 

World Music Awards
The World Music Awards honours recording artists based on worldwide sales figures provided by the International Federation of the Phonographic Industry. Barenaked Ladies has received one award.

|-
| 2000 || Barenaked Ladies || World's Best-Selling Canadian Group ||

Beyond music

Biography
Barenaked Ladies have an authorized biography, which was released in 2001, titled Public Stunts Private Stories, written by a friend of the band and fellow Scarborough native Paul Myers with input from the band. It is published in Canada by Madrigal Press. An updated version of the biography was released in 2003 in the US with a different cover, several corrections, and additional information about Disc One: All Their Greatest Hits and Everything to Everyone, which were released after the initial printing.

Canadian Music Creators Coalition
In May 2006, Barenaked Ladies, along with other prominent Canadian musicians, formed the Canadian Music Creators Coalition in response to plans by the Canadian government to revisit and update copyright laws. Steven Page has acted as a conduit between the CMCC and the press, urging the government to focus on the Canadian cultural scene. Page has said the formation of the CMCC was in response to what he believes is the wrong direction taken by the RIAA and the major labels, by suing fans for filesharing.

Barenaked Planet
The band has also become a proponent of environmentalism, following from Page's passion for greening (he is himself a board member of WWF Canada). The group began bringing an "eco-village" organized by the Reverb organization on their 2004 Au Naturale tour. The band has since partnered with Reverb to form the "Barenaked Planet" project, which is the group's label for their project to progressively "green" their touring. Efforts the band have made include ensuring backstage materials are recycled, using biodiesel in their tour vehicles (B20 as of December 2006), and offsetting carbon emissions with wind power. This includes both band-sponsored offsets for their own emissions, as well as having volunteers sell "Barenaked Planet" stickers to concertgoers with the money going to offset their drives to the venues.

If I Had 1,000,000 Flavours ice cream
Barenaked Ladies is the first Canadian band to receive their own ice cream flavour, following in the footsteps of other band-themed Ben & Jerry's flavours such as Cherry Garcia (Jerry Garcia), One Sweet Whirled and Magic Brownies (Dave Matthews Band) and Phish Food (Phish).

Artists Against Racism
Barenaked Ladies are a member of Canadian charity Artists Against Racism and has worked with them in the past on awareness campaigns.

WE Charity

Barenaked Ladies have made several appearances during WE Day events, performing in front of thousands of teenagers, empowering the young students to get involved in their communities and to promote social activity through WE charity's work.

Rock CAN Rol

Barenaked Ladies have supported hunger relief organization Rock Can Rol and together with their fans have helped to feed people in need.

Side projects
Tyler Stewart, Jim Creeggan, Kevin Hearn, and Ed Robertson all have past or present side projects during their time off from Barenaked Ladies. Stewart was part of a short-lived trio called Don't Talk Dance, which released a self-titled album in 1995 featuring Chris Brown (who later sat in for Hearn with Barenaked Ladies during his late-90s cancer treatment). The album was made for charity, and all profits went to Casey House, an AIDS charity in Canada. Stewart also plays occasionally with the rockabilly band Pogo Rodeo which he first joined in high school. The band reunited in the early 2010s and has since played occasional concerts

Jim Creeggan formed the alternative/jazz group The Brothers Creeggan, with brother and former Barenaked Ladies member Andy Creeggan, later joined by Ian McLauchlan (who died in 2009). The group (variously as a duo and a trio) recorded four albums between 1995 and 2002. The group stopped performing regularly in the mid-2000s and have only played together on rare occasions, such as for Barenaked Ladies' cruises. Andy Creeggan also has several solo albums, with the most recent one released in 2021.

Since 1995, Kevin Hearn has released four albums as the frontman of Kevin Hearn and Thin Buckle and three others with solo billing (with members of Thin Buckle as well as other musicians backing him). Hearn's albums feature a mix of alternative rock and jazz with many other eclectic influences. Hearn continues to perform in the Toronto area and occasionally tours with Thin Buckle. Hearn was also the musical director and keyboardist for Lou Reed's band from the mid-2000s until Reed's passing in October 2013. He has also released an album of love songs as "The Cousins" in 2004 with his cousin, comedian Harland Williams.

Robertson joined a supergroup called Yukon Kornelius in 2008 with Dave Matthews Band bass player Stefan Lessard, singer/guitarist Adam Gardner of Guster, and drummer Eric Fawcett of Spymob. To date, the band has played four shows, but they anticipate doing a short tour when work with their other bands permit. Special guests usually join Yukon Kornelius during their shows, including Dee Snider of Twisted Sister, Carl Bell (formerly of Fuel), Tyler Stewart, and other members of the Dave Matthews Band. Robertson also hosted three seasons of the 2006 television program called Ed's Up for OLN Canada in which he flew his own plane to various locations to experience and publicize a variety of interesting occupations.

Former member Steven Page had a side project called The Vanity Project. The first self-titled album was written mostly with long-time collaborator Stephen Duffy. In the wake of a band decision to try to keep songwriting amongst its then-five members, Page said that the project was an opportunity for him to write with non-Barenaked Ladies writers. He indicated that a future release might include other writers and not necessarily Duffy. However, Page did not record a second Vanity Project album before his departure from Barenaked Ladies and has released his post-Barenaked Ladies works in his own name. Page has also hosted a season of the reality television series The Illegal Eater, which features Page travelling to showcase food and drink experiences that are in some way taboo, illicit, or outright illegal.

Also, band members (both individually and together) have often collaborated with other artists, such as making guest appearances on their albums, performing live, or co-writing songs with them.

In February 2019 all four band members joined Canadian rock musician Kim Mitchell in recording a rework of Mitchell's former band Max Webster song Diamonds Diamonds from their 1977 album High Class in Borrowed Shoes. A video of the collaboration was released on YouTube.

Reception
In December 2008, former member of the Beatles Paul McCartney was reportedly asked by a session musician which bands he enjoys in the current music scene. His response was Barenaked Ladies: "Their harmonies are right on. They could outsing us any day of the week. I don't think John and myself ever had the sort of range they do." McCartney added that he would not mind recording with the band in the future.

In 2018, notable Ontarian musical historians Liam Coholan, Patrick Murphy, and Jon "The Don" Dilario acknowledge in their latest Canadian music history issue that "BNL was one of the most impactful bands when it comes to discussing the development of Canadian society in the 21st century."

Discography

Studio albums
Gordon (1992)
Maybe You Should Drive (1994)
Born on a Pirate Ship (1996)
Stunt (1998)
Maroon (2000)
Everything to Everyone (2003)
Barenaked Ladies Are Me (2006)
Barenaked Ladies Are Men (2007)
All in Good Time (2010)
Grinning Streak (2013)
Silverball (2015)
Fake Nudes (2017)
Detour de Force (2021)

Video releases
 Barenaked in America
 Too Little Too Late
 Barelaked Nadies
 The Barenaked Truth
 Talk to the Hand: Live in Michigan

References

External links

 
 
 Article at canadianbands.com

 
Musical groups established in 1988
Fellows of the Royal Conservatory of Music
Canadian alternative rock groups
Jangle pop groups
Canadian buskers
Sire Records artists
Canadian folk rock groups
Musical groups from Toronto
Scarborough, Toronto
Juno Award for Single of the Year winners
1988 establishments in Ontario
1990s in Canadian music
Geek rock groups
Musical quartets
Juno Award for Album of the Year winners
Juno Award for Children's Album of the Year winners
Juno Award for Group of the Year winners
World Music Awards winners
Juno Award for Pop Album of the Year winners
Sibling musical groups
Canadian comedy musical groups
Canadian Music Hall of Fame inductees